Virginia Welles (born Virginia Francine Welter; June 25, 1925 – September 19, 2002) was an American film actress. She is known for appearing in Shirley Temple films such as Kiss and Tell (1945) and A Kiss for Corliss (1949).

Welles was found by a talent agent while visiting Hollywood for her sister's wedding, where she was encouraged to do a screen test. Despite the offer, she instead opted to enrol on a college course in dramatics, where she was trained by actress Maude Adams. Upon her return to Hollywood, she signed a contract with Paramount Studios after her screen-test was picked up by agent William Meiklejohn.

She later took a break from the film industry to become a stage actress, before taking a hiatus from show business to raise a family. She returned several years later to star in Francis in the Haunted House opposite Mickey Rooney in 1956.

Welles died in September 2002 and was survived by her children and grandchildren.

Early life
Welles was born Virginia Francine Welter in Wausau, Wisconsin to parents Frank and Phylis (née Wheldon) Welter on June 25, 1925. She was the youngest of two daughters, her older sister being Gwendolyn, around 2 years her senior. She studied dance and piano in Wausau public schools.

Welles was privately educated at Stephens College, where she originally registered for a course in interior decoration. Prior to the term starting, she and her mother visited Hollywood for her sister's wedding. While there, they visited a boxing match to see movie stars and upon leaving, Welles was invited by an assistant director to attend an interview the following day with a casting director. Despite being offered a screen test, she opted instead to complete another year of college and was encouraged to return in a year by the studio.

In 1943, she enrolled back at Stephens College, specializing to study drama under the tuition of renowned actress Maude Adams.

Career

Welles was a successful film actress with Paramount Studios, featuring in movies such as To Each His Own and Kiss and Tell, the latter of which was her film debut. After college, she had returned to Hollywood in June 1945 to be screen-tested by Warner Brothers, but did not sign a contract. Talent agent William Meiklejohn heard about her test and ran it for the executives of Paramount, who she signed a contract with on August 7, 1945.

Welles made her first visit to New York City in 1947 when filming for Ladies' Man, where she learnt about expressing dislike towards the subway. She struggled to adopt the right expression, having been asked to look frantic by told by the director she only looked "mild". She instead opted for wildness, which is how the scene was shot, though she later accepted that the expression used in the film was not right, noting that "people in the subway look dazed".

After starring in numerous films during the 1940s, Welles became a stage actress in San Francisco before leaving show business to dedicate her life to her family. She returned to the screens in 1956 after a hiatus of around 5 years to raise her children. She returned to star alongside Mickey Rooney in the 1956 film Francis in the Haunted House. During her hiatus, she featured in several movie shorts and on television, although not in any major roles. In an interview upon her return to filming, she expressed the challenges faced with working opposite tall leading men, in that she would get cracks in her back from looking up and feel fragile during romantic scenes. Her only film where the leading man was shorter than her was Eddie Bracken in Ladies' Man.

Personal life
Welles married insurance salesman Henry Kuh in September 1948 and with him had a son, Henry and a daughter, Patricia (Patsy). They divorced in February 1977.

Her daughter was severely injured in a car accident in 1972 and Welles devoted 30 years of her life as her carer. She enjoyed playing the piano and was a music composer.

Death
She died on September 19, 2002 in Rancho Mirage, California and was survived by her two children and two grandchildren.

Filmography

References

External links

 

1925 births
2002 deaths
20th-century American actresses
Actresses from Wisconsin
American film actresses
American stage actresses
People from Wausau, Wisconsin